Sedum lampusae is a species of flowering plant in the family Crassulaceae. It is an erect herb to 50 cm, dying after one flowering. Basal leaves flat, glaucous, fleshy, spoon-shaped, 4–10 cm long, forming neat rosette which usually shrivels before the flowers open; steam leaves progressively smaller; inflorescence a long cylindrical or pyramidal spray, flowers numerous, crowded, brownish green, calyx-lobes and petals both 5, the latter narrow, pointed, 4 mm long, with a dark central vein. Stamens 10, follicles usually 5, erect, 5 mm long. Flowers from June to August. Common name is Lapta Damkoruğu.

Habitat
Walls, rock crevices and dry stony slopes.

Distribution
Endemic to Northern Cyprus. Frequent along the Kyrenia Range, notably at and above Lapta (whence the specific name).

References

External links
http://www.theplantlist.org/tpl/record/kew-2483775
http://www.treknature.com/gallery/Middle_East/Cyprus/photo232807.htm
http://public.fotki.com/PanosS/friends_col_of_cact/pictures/the-endemic-succule/sedum-lampusae.html
https://www.flickr.com/photos/21657471@N04/5532131871/

lampusae
Endemic flora of Cyprus
Taxa named by Pierre Edmond Boissier
Taxa named by Theodor Kotschy